Frederick ("Fred") Feary (April 10, 1912 – April 20, 1994) was an American boxer who competed in the 1932 Summer Olympics.

Born in Stockton, California Feary was the United States amateur heavyweight champion in 1932. At the 1932 Los Angeles Olympics, Feary won the bronze medal in the heavyweight class after winning the third-place fight against George Maughan by walkover.  Only six boxers competed in the heavyweight division.

1932 Olympic results
Below are the results of Frederick Feary, an American boxer who competed in the heavyweight division at the 1932 Los Angeles Olympics:

 Quarterfinal: bye
 Semifinal: lost to Luigi Rovati (Italy) on points
 Bronze Medal Bout: defeated George Maughan (Canada) by walkover (was awarded bronze medal)

References
 profile
Fight Record

1912 births
1994 deaths
Sportspeople from Stockton, California
Boxers from California
Heavyweight boxers
Boxers at the 1932 Summer Olympics
Olympic bronze medalists for the United States in boxing
Winners of the United States Championship for amateur boxers
American male boxers
Medalists at the 1932 Summer Olympics